The 2016 WNBA season is the 17th season for the Indiana Fever of the Women's National Basketball Association. The season tipped off on May 1. The Fever finished with a record of 17–17, third in the Eastern Conference and fifth overall. The Fever made the First Round of the 2016 WNBA Playoffs, losing to the Phoenix Mercury. It was the team's 13th appearance in the WNBA playoffs.

Transactions

WNBA Draft

The Fever made three selections in the 2016 WNBA Entry Draft in Uncasville, Connecticut:

Trades

Roster

Preseason

|- bgcolor="bbffbb"
| 1 || May 1, 20161:00 pm || Dallas || 108-90 || Lucas - 22 || || || Bankers Life Fieldhouse || 1-0
|- bgcolor="bbffbb"
| 2 || May 6, 201611:30 am || Washington || 89-69 || Early - 12 || || || Verizon Center || 2-0

Regular season

Game log

|-style="background:#fcc;"
| 1 || May 14, 20166:00 pm || Dallas || 79-90 || Mitchell - 18 || Larkins - 13 || Larkins - 4 || Bankers Life Fieldhouse8,569 || 0-1
|- bgcolor="bbffbb"
| 2 || May 18, 20167:00 pm || Phoenix || 97-93 || Tied - 16 || Larkins - 10 || Johnson - 7 || Bankers Life Fieldhouse6,749 || 1-1
|-bgcolor="bbffbb"
| 3 || May 20, 20167:00 pm || Atlanta || 94-85 || Catchings - 14 || Johnson - 7 || Moseley - 6 || Bankers Life Fieldhouse7,608|| 2-1
|-style="background:#fcc;"
| 4 || May 27, 20168:00 pm || Minnesota || 71-74 || Mitchell - 16 || Tied - 6 || Mitchell - 4 || Target Center7,503 || 2-2
|-style="background:#fcc;"
| 5 || May 29, 20163:00 pm || Atlanta || 74-76 || Wheeler - 18 || Tied - 8 || Wheeler - 7 || Philips Arena5,233 || 2-3

|-bgcolor="bbffbb"
| 6 || June 1, 20167:00 pm || Seattle || 85-75 || Kizer - 20 || Coleman - 7 || Tied - 3 || Bankers Life Fieldhouse6,721 || 3-3
|-style="background:#fcc;"
| 7 || June 3, 20167:30 pm || New York || 59-91 || Mitchell - 11 || Larkins - 7 || January - 3 || Madison Square Garden8,566 || 3-4
|-bgcolor="bbffbb"
| 8 || June 5, 20163:00 pm || Connecticut || 88-77 || Mitchell - 21 || Larkins - 10 || January -5 || Mohegan Sun Arena5,346 || 4-4
|-style="background:#fcc;"
| 9 || June 10, 20167:00 pm || Chicago || 64-73 || January - 17 || Larkins - 9 || Coleman - 5 || Bankers Life Fieldhouse7,533 || 4-5
|-style="background:#fcc;"
| 10 || June 12, 20166:00 pm || Seattle || 88-90 || Catchings - 27 || Catchings - 6 || Coleman - 3 || Bankers Life Fieldhouse6,724 || 4-6
|-style="background:#fcc;"
| 11 || June 14, 20168:00 pm || Minnesota || 63-87 || Larkins - 12 || Larkins - 9 || January - 8 || Target Center7,623 || 4-7
|-bgcolor="bbffbb"
| 12 || June 17, 20168:00 pm || San Antonio || 84-75 || Catchings - 23 || Larkins - 8 || January - 8 || AT&T Center6,107 || 5-7
|-style="background:#fcc;"
| 13 || June 19, 20162:00 pm || New York || 75-78 OT || Catchings - 23 || Larkins - 15 || January 5 || Bankers Life Fieldhouse7,440 || 5-8
|-style="background:#fcc;"
| 14 || June 227:00 pm || Washington || 62-76 || Kizer - 18 || Tied - 7 || Tied - 4 || Verizon Center4,430 || 5-9
|-bgcolor="bbffbb"
| 15 || June 258:30 pm || Dallas || 92-87 || Larkins - 19 || Larkins - 7 || January - 7 || College Park Center5,206 || 6-9
|-bgcolor="bbffbb"
| 16 || June 2912:30 pm || Chicago || 95-83 || Catchings - 26 || Larkins - 9 || Wheeler - 9 || Allstate Arena11,892 || 7-9

|-style="background:#fcc;"
| 17 || July 1, 20167:00 pm  || San Antonio || 85-87 OT || Larkins - 16 || Larkins - 17 || January 7 || Bankers Life Fieldhouse7,519 || 7-10
|-style="background:#fcc;"
| 18 || July 6, 201610:30 pm || Los Angeles || 88-94 || Mitchell - 20 || Tied - 4 || Wheeler - 7 || Staples Center8,224 || 7-11
|-bgcolor="bbffbb"
| 19 || July 8, 201610:00 pm || Phoenix || 78-60 || Tied - 13 || Larkins - 10 || Tied - 3 || US Airways Center10,371 || 8-11
|-bgcolor="bbffbb"
| 20 || July 10, 20167:00 pm || Seattle || 93-82 || Johnson - 18 || Larkins - 7 || January - 7 || KeyArena5,975 || 9-11
|-style="background:#fcc;"
| 21 || July 13, 201612:00 pm || Connecticut || 64-86 || Kizer - 18 || Catchings - 6 || January - 5 || Bankers Life Fieldhouse12,272 || 9-12
|-bgcolor="bbffbb"
| 22 || July 15, 20167:00 pm || Atlanta || 78-72 || Tied - 18 || Larkins - 11 || January - 6 || Bankers Life Fieldhouse8,612 || 10-12
|-bgcolor="bbffbb"
| 23 || July 19, 20168:00 pm || Los Angeles || 92-82 || Catchings - 23 || Tied - 5 || January - 9 || Bankers Life Fieldhouse7,269 || 11-12
|-bgcolor="bbffbb"
| 24 || July 21, 201611:00 am || New York || 82-70 || Kizer - 21 || Catchings - 8 || Johnson - 7 || Madison Square Garden11,253 || 12-12

|-style="background:#fcc;"
| 25 || August 27, 20167:00 pm || Washington || 69-92 || Tied - 12 || Johnson - 9 || January - 7 || Bankers Life Fieldhouse8,081 || 12-13
|-style="background:#fcc;"
| 26 || August 30, 20167:00 pm || Phoenix || 65-79 || Larkins - 12 || Larkins - 8 || January - 4 || Bankers Life Fieldhouse7,250 || 12-14

|-bgcolor="bbffbb"
| 27 || September 1, 20167:00 pm || New York || 98-77 || Johnson - 21 || Catchings - 9 || Tied - 4 || Bankers Life Fieldhouse6,524 || 13-14
|-style="background:#fcc;"
| 28 || September 4, 20167:00 pm || Los Angeles || 81-88 || Wheeler - 20 || Larkins - 7 || January -5 || Staples Center11,332 || 13-15
|-bgcolor="bbffbb"
| 29 || September 6, 20168:00 pm || San Antonio || 71-69 || Kizer - 15 || Tied - 8 || Tied - 2 || AT&T Center5,838 || 14-15
|-bgcolor="bbffbb"
| 30 || September 9, 20167:00 pm || Chicago || 95-88 || January - 20 || Catchings - 8 || January - 6 || Bankers Life Fieldhouse10,533 || 15-15
|-bgcolor="bbffbb"
| 31 || September 11, 20164:00 pm || Washington || 80-73 || Tied - 17 || Coleman - 7 || January - 4 || Verizon Center6,542 || 16-15
|-style="background:#fcc;"
| 32 || September 13, 20167:00 pm  || Connecticut || 87-89 || Johnson - 23 || Tied - 8 || Catchings - 4 || Mohegan Sun Arena4,407 || 16-16
|-style="background:#fcc;"
| 33 || September 16, 20167:00 pm || Minnesota || 75-82 || Coleman - 19 || Larkins - 6 || Larkins - 4 || Bankers Life Fieldhouse8,663 || 16-17
|-bgcolor="bbffbb"
| 34 || September 18, 20164:00 pm || Dallas || 83-60 || Tied - 16 || Larkins - 9 || January - 8 || Bankers Life Fieldhouse17,704 || 17-17

Standings

Playoffs
The Fever qualified for the 2016 playoffs with the 5th best season record in the WNBA. The Fever would lose to the Phoenxi Mercury in the first round, single-elimination game.

Regular season

Awards and honors
2016 Kim Perrot Sportsmanship Award: Tamika Catchings
2016 All-Defensive First Team: Briann January
2016 All-Defensive Second Team: Tamika Catchings
2016 All-Rookie Team: Tiffany Mitchell

References

External links
 

Indiana
Indiana Fever seasons
Fever